Rogers Mtagwa (born March 22, 1979) is a Tanzanian former professional boxer who competed from 1997 to 2014. He challenged three times for a world title; the WBO junior featherweight title in 2009, the WBA (Regular) featherweight title in 2010, and the WBC featherweight title in 2011.

Professional career
Mtagwa began his professional career on February 10, 1997, gaining a points victory over Alfred Mgaromba in Dar es Salaam. Mtagwa tasted defeat for the first time when he travelled to Kenya to face Joseph Waweru, losing a six rounds points decision. However, this loss was avenged when he scored a knockout over Waweru in the rematch.

Mtagwa left Tanzania and relocated to Philadelphia, United States. His first fight in his new home city was on May 2, 2000, losing an eight round decision to Debind Thapa.

On October 10, 2009 Mtagwa challenged for the WBO super bantamweight title against the undefeated Puerto Rican fighter Juan Manuel López in what was considered a fight of the year candidate. Although Lopez won the fight by a unanimous decision, he was hurt badly by Mtagwa in the later rounds and struggled to stay on his feet to hear the final bell.

On 23 January 2010 Mtagwa stepped up to featherweight to unsuccessfully challenge the Cuban Yuriorkis Gamboa for the WBA featherweight title. Mtagwa did not perform as well as he did in his previous title challenge, he was knocked down three times before the referee called a stop to the action in round two.

Professional boxing record

References

External links
 

Tanzanian male boxers
Featherweight boxers
Super-bantamweight boxers
African Boxing Union champions
People from Dodoma
Living people
1979 births